Kevin Crowley (born November 13, 1988 in New Westminster, British Columbia) is a Canadian professional lacrosse player for the San Diego Seals in the National Lacrosse League Crowley is one of only three players in the history of lacrosse to be drafted first overall in both professional leagues. Crowley attended New Westminster Secondary School and played his collegiate lacrosse at Stony Brook University and Simon Fraser University

College career
 2011 USILA Midfielder of the Year
 2011 First team All-American
 2010 USILA Player of the Year
 2010 First team All-American
 Unanimous America East Player of the Year
 Tewaaraton Trophy Finalist
 Stony Brook University's all-time leader in points with 232
 Stony Brook University's first first-team All American
 One of 40 players in Division 1 history to record 100 or more goals and assists
 One of three players in America East history to be named First team all 4 years

NLL career
Kevin Crowley was drafted by the original Philadelphia Wings in the first round of the 2012 NLL Entry Draft. Crowley finished second in rookie scoring in 2012, and also was named to the 2012 NLL All-Star team. After the 2014 season, the Wings moved to Uncasville, Connecticut, becoming the New England Black Wolves. At the 2015 trade deadline, Crowley was traded to the Toronto Rock for holdout Garrett Billings.

After finishing the 2015 season in Toronto, Crowley was traded back to New England in exchange for first round pick Dan Lintner and a 2016 second round draft pick.

On January 5, 2019, Crowley was traded to the new expansion Philadelphia Wings, the replacement team in Philadelphia for the original team with whom Crowley moved to New England in 2014.

MLL career
Crowley was the Hamilton Nationals’ first-round selection (first overall) in the 2011 MLL Collegiate Draft. After moving with the Nationals to Florida in 2014, Crowley was traded to the Chesapeake Bayhawks. After the 2015 season, Crowley was traded again, this time to the Charlotte Hounds. After a stint with the New York Lizards, Crowley was traded to the Philadelphia Barrage in May 2020, in the city where he already plays for the NLL indoor team.

International lacrosse career
2010- Member of Team Canada, finalists in the 2010 World Lacrosse Championships in Manchester England
2008-Member of Team Canada's U-19 team, finalists in the 2008 U-19 World Lacrosse Championship in Coquitlam, British Columbia

Canadian Lacrosse Association career
Crowley played for the New Westminster Salmonbellies of the Western Lacrosse Association and the West Coast Junior Lacrosse League. In 2011, he played for the Senior "A" New Westminster Salmonbellies and led the WLA playoffs with 39 points... Played five seasons for New Westminster in the WLA Junior "A" league... In 2009, he was voted the winner of the John Urban Award as the top graduating player... That same season he was a First Team All-Star and fourth in scoring... In 2009, he also played for the Senior "A" Salmonbellies

Statistics

Stony Brook University

__

NLL
Reference:

MLL

References

1988 births
Living people
Sportspeople from New Westminster
Philadelphia Wings players
New England Black Wolves players
Toronto Rock players
Canadian lacrosse players
Major League Lacrosse players
National Lacrosse League All-Stars
Hamilton Nationals players
Chesapeake Bayhawks players
Stony Brook Seawolves men's lacrosse players
Charlotte Hounds players